Peter Engler (born 3 September 1936) is a German former football player and manager who played as a midfielder. His 26 Bundesliga appearances and two goals came in the 1965–66 SC Tasmania 1900 Berlin season, known as the worst season of any team in the Bundesliga.

References

1936 births
Living people
German footballers
Association football midfielders
Bundesliga players
SC Tasmania 1900 Berlin players
Hertha BSC players
1. FC Nürnberg players
FC Lausanne-Sport players
German football managers
German expatriate footballers
German expatriate sportspeople in Switzerland
Expatriate footballers in Switzerland